Marshall David Brain II (born May 17, 1961) is an American author, public speaker, futurist, and entrepreneur who specializes in making complex topics easy to understand. Brain is the founder of HowStuffWorks.com and the author of the How Stuff Works book series. He hosted the National Geographic channel's Factory Floor with Marshall Brain and Who Knew? With Marshall Brain.

Early life and education
Marshall Brain was born in Santa Monica, California, where his father designed components for moon rockets.  He received a B.S. in electrical engineering from Rensselaer Polytechnic Institute in 1983, and a M.S in computer science from North Carolina State University. 

Marshall taught in the computer science department at North Carolina State University from 1986 to 1992.  He also wrote computer programming manuals and ran a software training and consulting company.

Business career
In 1998, Brain founded the website HowStuffWorks.com as a hobby.  In 2002, Time magazine described HowStuffWorks.com as "an eclectic encyclopedia that covers everything from torque converters to dieting to DNA."  In 2002, Brain sold a part of his related company, How Stuff Works Inc., to The Convex Group, an Atlanta-based investment company owned by former Web MD CEO Jeff Arnold, for an estimated $1 million. Discovery purchased the website for $250 million in 2007 and introduced its television show How Stuff Works in 2008.

In 2008 and 2009, he hosted Factory Floor with Marshall Brain and the Who Knew? With Marshall Brain, both on the National Geographic channel. For these shows, Brain showed viewers how products are designed, tested, and manufactured. Brain says shows like this are popular because "We use this stuff every day and some of it's so interesting. Like the science underneath it, and how people use that science to make the product and other people make it cheap enough for all of us to be able to afford it."

Brain has appeared on The Oprah Winfrey Show, Dr. Oz, Good Morning America, CNN, and Modern Marvels. 

In addition to his How Stuff Works nonfiction book series, Brain writes about robotics, transhumanism, and atheism, including his books The Second Intelligent Species: How Humans Will Become as Irrelevant as Cockroaches (2015) and Manna: Two Views of Humanity's Future (2012). Brain maintains that automation and robots will lead to unemployment for humans, such as 1.5 million big-rig truck drivers in the U.S. losing their jobs to self-driving cars, requiring a government guaranteed minimum income.  

Brain currently lectures and is the director of the Engineering Entrepreneurs Program at North Carolina State University. He is currently working on EcoPRT, a new transportation system, with Dr. Seth Hollar.

Personal life
Brain resides in Cary, North Carolina with his wife Leigh and four children. He is an atheist and runs the website Why Won't God Heal Amputees?. In 2018, he was a speaker during the March for Science, a protest against President Donald Trump.

Publications

Television Shows
 Factory Floor with Marshall Brain (2008) – Host
 Who Knew? With Marshall Brain (2008) – Host

References

1961 births
Living people
American futurologists
American atheists
American technology writers
Rensselaer Polytechnic Institute alumni
North Carolina State University alumni
People from Cary, North Carolina
American transhumanists
Marist School (Georgia) alumni
People from Santa Monica, California
American computer programmers
American television personalities